Paulette Reck (born c. 1948) is a former pageant titleholder from Baltimore, Maryland who has competed in the Miss USA pageant.

Reck is a graduate of Mercy High School  and Villa Julie College, in Stevenson, Maryland. She held the Miss Maryland USA title 1968 and placed 1st runner up to Dorothy Anstett at Miss USA 1968. The following year she competed and won the Miss Maryland World contest and placed second runner-up at Miss World USA 1969. Bob Hope was affiliated with the Miss World Pageant and invited Paulette to join his tour. She entertained along with Joey Heatherton, Michelle Lee, Janis Paige, and John Davidson. She continued her career in television, modeling. Paulette was a spokesperson and model for Pontiac and Cadillac nationwide. Paulette could be seen on TV in Baltimore, Dallas, Denver, and Los Angeles. Paulette is a successful wife, mother and real estate broker living in south Florida.

References 

1948 births
Miss USA 1960s delegates
People from Baltimore
Stevenson University alumni
Living people